Volunteer Point is a headland on the east coast of East Falkland, in the Falkland Islands, north-northeast of Stanley, and east of Johnson's Harbour and Berkeley Sound. It lies at the end of a narrow peninsula, which protects Volunteer Lagoon. It received its name in 1815, when the sealing ship Volunteer left a boat's crew there to collect seal skins while it went in search of opportunities elsewhere. Four years later, on 13 February 1820, the French research vessel L'Uranie struck a submerged rock just off the point but stayed afloat long enough to be beached in Berkeley Sound. All on board survived, including the Captain's wife, Rose de Freycinet, who recorded the incident in her diary.

Volunteer Shanty, a well maintained outhouse that was used by trekkers until a few years ago, is situated at the landward end of the point.

Strategic value in Falklands War
Volunteer Point is one of the easternmost points of the islands, but Cape Pembroke is the furthest east. During the Falklands War, Argentine commanders considered it a potential British landing point because it was far from continental Argentine airbases (e.g. Rio Grande, Comodoro Rivadavia), and those at Pebble Island and as a strategic foothold for any British force wishing to retake Stanley. However, in the event, the British landings took place on San Carlos Water in the west of East Falkland, on Falkland Sound.

Wildlife

Volunteer Point has been identified by BirdLife International as an Important Bird Area (IBA).  Birds for which the site is of conservation significance include Falkland steamer ducks (75 breeding pairs), ruddy-headed geese (100 pairs), gentoo penguins (3600 pairs as of March 2014), Magellanic penguins (estimated to be 2500 pairs as of March 2014) and white-bridled finches. 

Volunteer Point is notable for having about 2000 pairs (as of March 2020) of king penguins breed here, at the most northerly part of their range. King penguins were once nearly extinct in the Falklands, and Volunteer Point contains most of the Falkland population. There are also southern elephant seals. Another and much smaller king penguin colony of about 20 or so pairs resides on Saunders Island, Falkland Islands. These king penguins came to the Falklands due to over crowding as evidenced by the tight density of the larger colonies on the South Georgia (island) population. Since then, the colony on Volunteer point has been steadily growing since it was established back in 1971. The residents on the Falklands have placed a ring of white rocks to serve as a barrier that prevents tourists from getting too close to the penguins. As the colony continues growing, the rocks are placed slightly further from their original spot from as a way to expand the living space for the birds. If the rocks are too spread out, the locals place 1 or more rocks to fill in the gaps. Several groups of non-breeding birds can be seen near the colony standing at the edge of large puddles of water and are usually the first members of the species seen on a typical tour.

References

Headlands of East Falkland
Important Bird Areas of the Falkland Islands
Penguin colonies